Paraserianthes is a genus of flowering plants in the family Fabaceae. It belongs to the mimosoid clade of the subfamily Caesalpinioideae.

Taxonomy
Paraserianthes includes only one species:
 Paraserianthes lophantha (Willd.) I.C.Nielsen. This species includes two subspecies: P. lophantha subsp. lophantha in southwestern Australia, and P. lophantha subsp. montana (Jungh.) I.C. Nielsen in high elevation sites in Western Indonesia (Sumatara, Java and Western Nusa Tenggara Province).

The genus Paraserianthes originally comprised four species, divided into two sections based on morphological traits by Nielsen.  Section Paraserianthes included P. lophantha with two recognized subspecies, and section Falcataria included three species (P. falcataria, P. pullenii, and P. toona).

Based on morphology P. falcataria (L.) I.C.Nielsen was moved to the genus Falcataria by Barneby and Grimes, and renamed Falcataria moluccana (Miq.) Barneby & J.W.Grimes. Brown et al. used biogeographical, morphological and molecular studies to completely separate of these sections into two genera as Paraserianthes sensu Nielsen was paraphyletic. Now P. pullenii (Verdc.) I.C. Nielsen = Falcataria pullenii (Verdc.) G.K. Brown, D.J. Murphy & P.Y. Ladiges; and P. toona (F.M. Bailey) I.C. Nielsen = Falcataria toona (Bailey), G.K. Brown, D.J. Murphy & P.Y. Ladiges. Paraserianthes section remained in the genus with only Paraserianthes lophantha.

References

Mimosoids
Monotypic Fabaceae genera